Čentur is a settlement 5 km southeast of Koper in the Littoral region of Slovenia. It is divided into two separate hamlets: Veliki Čentur and Mali Čentur (literally, 'big Čentur' and 'little Čentur').

References

External links
Čentur on Geopedia

Populated places in the City Municipality of Koper